Pseuduncifera is a genus of moths belonging to the family Tortricidae.

Species
Pseuduncifera euchlanis Razowski, 1999

References
tortricidae.com

Polyorthini
Tortricidae genera
Taxa named by Józef Razowski